The Inekon 01 Trio is an articulated low-floor tram manufactured by company Inekon Trams. The company is a member of Inekon group. The tram is conceptually based on the Škoda 03 T developed by Škoda Transportation and Inekon Group.

Design 
The joint venture between Škoda and Inekon was dissolved in 2001, after which Škoda continued to sell the 03 T, while Inekon formed a new partnership with DPO (Dopravní podnik Ostrava, the city transport company of Ostrava), known as DPO Inekon, and in 2002 began selling a nearly identical version of the Astra, under the name Trio. The Trio is a three-carbody-section, four-axle (two-bogie) design, in which the low-floor area represents 50% of the entire vehicle floor area. The Inekon 01 Trio is a single-ended (uni-directional) version, buyers of which have included (as of 2008) the transport agencies in Olomouc and Ostrava. The first car was built in 2002, for Ostrava's tram system (DPO).

Deliveries and operation

References

External links 
 
 Low-floor tramway INEKON 01 TRIO

Tram vehicles of the Czech Republic